The 2000 Humboldt State Lumberjacks football team represented Humboldt State University during the 2000 NAIA football season. Humboldt State competed in the NAIA Columbia Football Association. The conference folded after the 2000 season. The four U.S.-based members of the CFA would return to the NCAA and become the charter members of the NCAA Division II Great Northwest Athletic Conference (GNAC) in 2001. Simon Fraser stayed in the NAIA and played as an independent in 2001. 

The 2000 Lumberjacks were led by first-year head coach Doug Adkins. They played home games at the Redwood Bowl in Arcata, California. Humboldt State finished the season with a record of four wins and seven losses (4–7, 1–3 CFA). The Lumberjacks were outscored by their opponents 192–224 for the 2000 season.

Schedule

References

Humboldt State
Humboldt State Lumberjacks football seasons
Humboldt State Lumberjacks football